Local elections was held in the Province of Quezon on May 9, 2016 as part of the 2016 general election.  Voters will select candidates for all local positions: a town mayor, vice mayor and town councilors, as well as members of the Sangguniang Panlalawigan, the vice-governor, governor and representatives for the four districts of Quezon.

Provincial elections
The candidates for governor and vice governor with the highest number of votes wins the seat; they are voted separately, therefore, they may be of different parties when elected.

Gubernatorial election
Parties are as stated in their certificate of candidacies.

David Suarez is the incumbent.

Vice-gubernatorial election
Parties are as stated in their certificate of candidacies.

Samuel Nantes is the incumbent.

Congressional elections

1st District
Wilfredo Mark Enverga is term-limited. Heis sister, Trina Enverga-Dela Paz, will run for congressman.

2nd District

3rd District

4th District

Provincial board elections

1st District

2nd District

3rd District

4th District

Lucena local elections
This refers to the candidates and winners of the 2016 election in the highly-urbanized city of Lucena, independent from the province.

Mayoralty elections
Mayor Roderick Alcala and Vice Mayor Philip Castillo is the incumbent.

City council elections

References 

2016 Philippine local elections
Elections in Quezon
Politics of Quezon
2016 elections in Calabarzon